1989 in professional wrestling describes the year's events in the world of professional wrestling.

List of notable promotions 
These promotions held notable shows in 1989.

Calendar of notable shows

Notable events
 January the alliance between The American Wrestling Association and The Continental Wrestling Association ended due to AWA Owner Verne Gagne refusing to pay then-World Champion Jerry Lawler for participating on the company's first-ever Pay-Per-View AWA SuperClash III.
The World Wrestling Association professional wrestling promotion based out of Indianapolis, Indiana, closed.
 August 4 WCCW becomes the USWA when Eric Embry pinned Phil Hickerson in a steel cage match in Dallas, Texas.

Tournaments and accomplishments

WCW

WWF

Awards and honors

Pro Wrestling Illustrated

Wrestling Observer Newsletter

Title changes

WWF

Births
January 11 - Natalia Markova
January 25 - Stu Grayson 
March 1 – Tenille Dashwood
April 9 – Bianca Belair
April 11 – Ariya Daivari
April 16 – Mia Yim
April 21 – Nikki Cross
May 19 – Tom Phillips (wrestling)
May 26 - Babatunde Aiyegbusi 
June 14 - Peter Avalon 
June 15 – Bayley
June 23 – Billie Kay
July 5 – Adam Cole
July 28 - Nick Jackson
August 8 - Gianni Valletta 
August 16 – Cedric Alexander
August 28 - Christina Von Eerie 
September 20 - Ethan Page 
October 3- T. K. O'Ryan 
October 11 – Riddick Moss
November 3 – Andrade "Cien" Almas
December 4 - Hiromu Takahashi

Debuts
 Uncertain Date: 
Sandman
X-Pac 
 Scotty 2 Hotty
 Billy Gunn 
 March 1 – Booker Huffman
 April 30 – Rey Mysterio
 May 11 – Steve Austin
 September 19 – Yoshihiro Tajiri
 October 8 – Kaoru Ito
 October 29 – Tommy Dreamer

Retirements
 Al Tomko (July 9, 1954 – 1989)
 Alfonso Dantés (1960–1989)
 Blue Demon (March 31, 1948 – August 27, 1989)
 Jonathan Boyd (1966–1989)
 Nelson Royal (1955–1989)
 Rayo de Jalisco (February 1950 – 1989)
 Steve Rickard (1943–1989)
 Victor Rivera (1964–1989)
 Big John Studd (1972–1989)

Deaths 
January 6 - Mario Galento, 73
January 7 - Aslam Pahalwan, 61
February 18 - Mildred Burke, 73
March 7 - Paul Boesch, 76
March 14 – Happy Humphrey, 62
April 17 – Villano II, 39
December 7 – Haystacks Calhoun, 55
December 28 – Earl Patrick Freeman, 57

See also
List of WCW pay-per-view events
List of WWF pay-per-view events
List of FMW supercards and pay-per-view events

References

 
professional wrestling